Sportland Arena is an association football stadium in Tallinn, Estonia. Located next to Estonia's largest stadium A. Le Coq Arena, it is part of the Lilleküla Football Complex. The stadium is named after the sporting goods retail company Sportland.

Sportland Arena is used as a home ground by TJK Legion. Due to its artificial turf surface and under-soil heating, the stadium also serves as the home ground for FC Flora, FCI Levadia and Tallinna Kalev in the winter and early spring months.

History 
First opened in 2003, the stadium underwent renovation for the 2018 season, for which a 1,198-seat grandstand was constructed on the south side of the ground. The stadium was also awarded the FIFA Quality Pro certificate, which is the highest quality standard for artificial turf football fields. 

The start of the 2022 Premium Liiga season saw Sportland Arena used as a home ground by 5 out of the 10 Estonian top-flight teams (Flora, Levadia, Kalju, Kalev, Legion), which resulted in 23 out of the first 45 matches being held in one stadium. In total, Sportland Arena hosted 51 Premium Liiga matches during the 2022 season, meaning 28% of the whole league campaign was played in this stadium. This received heavy criticism by the Estonian football community, who mockingly suggested the league to be renamed as "Sportland Arena Liiga".

Future 
The future of Sportland Arena will see the stadium have a capacity of 4,500, so it would be eligible for the UEFA Stadium Category 3 certificate and would thus be able to host international matches. The south stand was constructed in 2018 and the remaining three stands are to be completed by 2025.

Gallery

References

Football venues in Estonia
Sports venues in Tallinn